Benjamin Edward Bates IV (July 12, 1808 – January 14, 1878) was an American rail industrialist, textile tycoon and philanthropist. He was the wealthiest person in Maine from 1850 to 1878, and is considered to have introduced both the Efficiency and Taylorism movements to the economy of Maine.

Bates was born to a large family in Mansfield, Massachusetts; he moved to Bristol, Maine, for a working residency at B. T. Loring Company before creating the Davis, Bates & Turner–a craft goods and service firm in the early 1830s. After entering the milling business, he built the Bates Mill in 1852 which launched the larger Bates Manufacturing Company in Lewiston, Maine. His company quickly became the largest per capita employer in Maine and the largest in Lewiston, for three decades. Contracted by the Maine State Legislature, Bates founded the Lewiston Water Power Company: a large mill-based enterprise that built the first canal in the city.

At the start of the American Civil War, Bates correctly anticipated that the talk of secession in the Southern States would lead to a shortage of cotton.  By buying up an unprecedented amount prior to the Battle of Fort Sumter, he cornered the market. The resulting shortage created an absolute monopoly and skyrocketing prices, which drove dozens of New England businesses to close due to the inability to compete. Growing economic inequality in the city culminated to 1861 Lewistown cotton riots which led Bates to loosen his expansionary business tactics and increase philanthropic spending.

Like other business magnates at the time, such as J.P. Morgan, Andrew Carnegie, and John D. Rockefeller, Bates supported capitalism and anti-competitiveness. The public's opinion of Bates was highly polarized throughout his life with some citing his economic impact as critical, while others criticized his business tactics as socially detrimental.

Early life and education
Benjamin Edward Bates IV, was born in Mansfield, Massachusetts, on July 12, 1808, to Hannah Copeland and Elkanah Bates as their third child (of seven). His father, Elkanah Bates, was a cotton manufacturer and prominent merchant. Both of his parents were religious and belonged to the Congregational Church of Mansfield. In 1838, there was a denominational split within the church to create a Unitarian theologian association that questioned the divinity of Christ, Elkanah Bates was picked to lead the movement. His paternal grandfather fought in the American Revolution as a Captain, and later became a brigadier general for the Massachusetts state militia. He is the great-great grandson of Benjamin Bates II, Commander of the Devonshire Forces, and member of the Hell Fire Club. When Bates was a younger boy, his brother recounts him being dragged by two horses across a "considerable distance" which left him badly cut and bruised, he pulled the horses down and eventually halted their movement, a considerable task considering Bates was only 14 years old at the time.

Bates attended various private schools and enrolled at the age of 15 to the Wrentham Academy, and studied there from 1823 to 1825, before moving to Boston, Massachusetts, in 1829, at age 21. Bates entered the dry goods business with Barnabas T. Loring on Washington Street. At age 24, he made a public profession of Christian faith, and he was a lifelong Congregationalist and temperance supporter. Bates taught Sunday school at several churches in Boston including Park Street Church and was later an active member of Central Congregational Church in Boston.

Business pursuits

B. T. Loring & Co.
John G. Davis met Benjamin Bates in the early 1830s and the two later became business partners. They met while Bates was a clerk for Barnabas T. Loring on Washington Street after a mutual friend offered "a firm with respected work." At the time with Bates' net worth was at $700, which was considered lower-middle class at the time. The firm subsequently organized as the B. T. Loring Company. The firm's market expanded widely throughout Maine and went on to depart from retail and focus on whole sale, which was made possible by the connections Bates had made throughout his career in Bristol, Maine. One year later, they moved "downtown" from Washington Street to Central Street, and continued operations. Barnabas T. Loring died prompting the group to dissolve B. T. Loring & Co., and create Davis, Bates, & Turner.

Davis, Bates & Turner
With the conclusion of B. T. Loring & Co., Bates co-founded the firm of Davis, & Bates, which existed from 1833 until 1847. The firm enjoyed financial success as its previous deals garnered high standing among the mercantile community of Maine. With the firm on stable footing, John N. Turner developed an interest and discussed furthered involvement. As a mutual friend of Bates, and his background in law, he was tasked with bookkeeping and legal relations. The firm amassed tens of thousands of dollars within years and the firm continued to grow. Turner was officially brought in on February 13, 1833, and the firm was officially renamed Davis, Bates & Turner.

Efficiency movement
Bates was known for his part in integrating the early manifestations of Taylorism in industrial Maine. His management style required high levels of managerial control and power over aggregated output which subsequently strained work practices. His firms were known for long work hours, poor working conditions and high output. He tended to his businesses "compulsively and incessantly" and often disregarded pressures to start a family, however did leave them with a considerable fortune at his death.

Financial panic of 1837
In 1837, the firm experienced low levels of revenue and output due to the external effects of panics involving financial security and credit in New York City. Considered the "greatest financial panic the country has ever seen", the Panic of 1837 caused numerous firms all over New England to fail, and Davis, Bates & Turner, often had trouble assessing market value and withdrawing loans from the banks. The firm remained active and even put up positive net return on some years during the panic due to their good credit and lack of debt. Due to the overall speculative markets involving whole sale goods, Bates' firm remained cautious when selling and taking out loans for restructuring. News from New York was delivered to Maine stating further banking regulation and overall stabilization of market prices, which brought the state out of a recessive period into a sustained growth. The news was received by Bates personally when George Bond, declared that loans would be issued by the New York Banks once again.

During the recovery consultations between Maine and Massachusetts business leaders, a prominent banker, Homer Bartlett was quoted as famously saying, Who was the strongest man in that meeting [referring to the financial panics]?To which the crowd overwhelmingly replied,Bates! Bates was the strongest man there.This quote would go on to largely shape Bates' minor celebrity status and fed the growing reputation of producing the best results in times of uncertainty. The crowd included, Lyman Nichols, George L. Ward, Alexander De Witt, Francis Skinner, Homer Bartlett, and St. John Smith. In 1840, the firm moved to Water Street, and five years later moved to Milk Street, where Davis withdrew from the firm due to poor health.

Bates, Turner & Co. and Union Pacific
Siles Bascom replaced Davis and the firm was renamed Bates, Turner & Co. The firm enjoyed financial success and began to conclude its practice with the closing of markets in March 1847. After the dissolution of the firm, Bates served as president and on the board of several banking, manufacturing, and railroad corporations, including First National Bank of Commerce in Boston. Due to his activities during the financial panic of 1837, he was asked to be the founding successor president of the Union Pacific Railroad on August 1, 1849; he served in this capacity until May 3, 1850, when Alexander De Witt spoke to him about opportunities in Lewiston, Maine prompting his immediate resignation.

Life in Lewiston

Bates travel to Lewiston regularly while living in Boston and other Maine towns, to "interact with the people, give guidance to the businesses, and support its economy." After the closing of Bates, Turner & Co., and a quick stint as president of the Union Pacific Railroad, he moved to Lewiston, Maine, upon the advisement of his close friend and confidant Alexander De Witt who went on describe Lewiston as a "city full of hope and innovation." He was escorted to the town secretly with De Witt, to meet with the city council and Mayor to discuss major developments in the town.

Bates Manufacturing Company
Bates quickly began developing companies, acquiring smaller ones under his Manufacturing Company, and subsequently brought in sixteen million dollars in revenue for the town, the largest circulation of currency in the history of Lewiston at the time. His businesses provided employment for thousands of people from Maine and Canada, which made him the single largest employer in the city, and the largest per capita of Maine. His businesses garnered millions of dollars for the city and with all assets accounted for in Maine and Massachusetts, he was considered the wealthiest man in Maine via his net worth.

His principal accomplishment during his early business career was the establishment of Bates Manufacturing Company. The company went on to be the largest manufacturing company in the state of Maine and provided two-thirds of all textile output for the state. It employed approximately five thousand people from Canadian and Irish descent. He served as the president of the company from its founding on January 3, 1850, until he appointed a successor to overtake the company as he left for Lewiston, Maine on February 20, 1862.

Lewiston Water Power Company
One of the primary goals of other business leaders in Maine and Bates was to improve the water quality of Lewiston. Bates went on to found the Lewiston Water Power Company, which built the first canal in the city. It employed hundreds of people and established the town as a "paragon of water quality." During this development Lewiston was the fastest growing city in Maine, in terms of growth rate.

Bates Mill

The Bates Mill was a textile factory company founded in 1850 and located at 35 Canal Street in Lewiston, Maine. Much of the capital generated from this mill was used in the foundation of Bates College. Since conception, Bates' practices with the mill dominated the mill industry and was one of the first great U.S. business trusts. He initially gained wealth and influence from manufacturing textiles and estate development with correspondence to the mills. His mills extended from the Androscoggin River to northern Lewiston. On August 16, 1850, Maine Governor John Hubbard signed the incorporation act and the mill was completed 1852. Bates positioned the mill in Lewiston due to the location of the Lewiston Falls which provided the mill with power. Under Bates' supervision, during the Civil War, the mill produced textiles to the Union Army. His mills generated employment for thousands of Canadians, and immigrants from Europe. The mill was Maine's largest employer for three decades.

1861 Lewistown cotton riots
Like numerous factories in Maine, Bates' mill was receiving cotton from the South, where it was grown and cultivated by slave labor. Correctly anticipating that the increasing talk of secession in the Southern States might eventually lead to a shortage of cotton, Bates bought an unprecedented amount of cotton prior to the Battle of Fort Sumter. During the War, Bates was able to produce uniforms for the Union Army as well as other textiles. His capitalization of this, saw to great levels of profit for his firms and companies, and caused dozens of mills to be closed due to overwhelming competition. After a rumor was spread around Lewiston that Bates held more money than the city, riots broke out in 1861, that decried the concentration wealth presented by Bates. Due to pressure from the public, he lessened his business tactics and created the philanthropic arm of the Bates Manufacturing Company tasked with giving out thousands to the people of Lewiston. During the riots his public image was tarnished and was advised by DeWitt to employ more people in his Mills. The Lewiston Sun Journal called him "the supplier of the cause," after he spoke at a town hall meeting detailing his employment of thousands of New Englanders and Canadians.

Later life and wealth

Economic panic of 1873

Bates pledged another $100,000 to be paid to the Maine State Seminary after his death, but due to the economic recession in the 1870s, known as the Panic of 1873, Bates' Lewiston assets were lessened. During this financial crisis many of his properties lessened in value and he was forced to refinance. Due to the dependence of Lewiston on Bates many citizens suffered financially in the personal losses of Bates. After the stabilization of his properties and business contracts he began a further expansion into Lewiston's economic environment, and regained considerable wealth. He built Bates Mill No.5 which became his fastest growing Mill within years and provided the city with substantial employment.

Wealth
By his death in 1878, Bates had amassed a total net worth of approximately $79.4 million (worth $1.84 billion in 2017). This includes assets held in Maine, New York, and Massachusetts that encompassed the non-operational value of B. T. Loring & Co., Bates, Turner & Co., his holding company the Bates Manufacturing Company, his stake in the Lewiston Water Company, Bates Mill, and miscellaneous banking endeavors in New York. He donated a total of $100,000 to the endowment, and approximately $250,000 to Bates College, indirectly and left a trust of $3.3 million to his family. In his will he pledged $50,000 to his wife Sarah Gilbert along with his 2.8 million dollar estate, $10,000 to his brother William, $10,000 to his brother Elkanah Bates II, $10,000 equally divided among the children of his sister, Charlotte, $10,000 to Edward Atkinson, and $10,000 to George Fabian. He left each of his children, Benjamin Edward V, Lilian, Sarah, and Author $250,000 in the form of a trust.

However, Bates had $200,000 in outstanding debt and a pledged $100,000 to Bates College after his death. His family was required expend the $100,000 pledged but due to conditions placed on the inheritances, restricted distribution, and familial debt, the Supreme Judicial Court of Massachusetts eventually ruled that Bates' heirs did not have to pay Bates College the pledged $100,000. After a period of recession the college began to financially recuperate to a larger endowment, independently. Over the next couple of years Bates College's endowment has grown slowly and steadily.

Philanthropy

Bates was the largest of the early donors to Maine State Seminary through the Lewiston Power Company. He was known by the people of Lewiston for having a "deep and profound love" for the town and the college, and its early founder mentioned his affection by noting: "I have frequently heard him say that he would not knowingly do anything against the interests of the people; and that he would sooner invest ten dollars in Lewiston than one dollar in any other place. 'I love Lewiston', 'I love the College', he was accustomed to say, 'Say to the Trustees that I love the College.'"In 1852, he personally pledged another $6,000 to the school. In 1853, Oren Burbank Cheney appointed him as a Trustee of the College and in 1854 subsequently became Chairman of the Board of Trustees of the college due to his considerable donations. He went onto donate $25,000 for the foundation of agriculture department and moved a subscription of $75,000 for campus expansion. On February 21, 1873, he donated $100,000 on the condition that the amount was met by third-party donors, within five years. Although he placed conditions on his donations, he realized his donations regardless of the conditions being met. The college remained a source of worry for Bates as much of the subscriptions to the college remained unfilled, donors were giving half of their donations and not fulfilling the other half, which left the endowment of the college in a speculative state. Bates served as the treasurer for the college in the early days and condemned the business strategy Cheney developed when interacting with potential donors advocating for a more aggressive procedure for funding.

His work with the college prompted fellow business magnate, Andrew Carnegie, to donate a considerable amount to the formation of the college and subsequently had the college's science building named after him. Bates played an integral role in the expansion of the college, moving from town to town and state to state spreading the institutions name. This brought in tens of thousands of dollars from the politically elite and wealthy who donated more on a favor to Bates than love of the college, as Bates had graduated little alumnus who went on to amass wealth.

By his death in 1878, Bates' donations to the college totalled over $100,000, and overall contributions valued at US$250,000 (worth US$6.2 million in March 2017 dollars).  
On March 16, 1864, the founder of the Maine State Seminary, Oren Burbank Cheney, renamed his institution of higher learning, "Bates College," in honor of Bates. However, when hearing that the college was renamed after him, he expressed his disappointment. He thought that he was not worthy of a college of "[such] inception and history," later noting his guilt for raising money for the college because donors might have thought he was raising money for himself.

Death and legacy

Benjamin Bates died on January 14, 1878, at age 69, in Boston, Massachusetts. His body was entombed at the Mount Auburn Cemetery on Fir Avenue in Cambridge, Massachusetts, two days later.

Bates Street, West Bates Street, and East Bates Street in Lewiston and Auburn, Maine, respectively, are named in his honor.

His death was attended by Lewiston, Boston, and New York City elite, and the Mayors of numerous cities gave speeches on his life. His funeral was held in the Lewiston City Hall, and clergymen gave speeches on his commitment to the college and God.

He was survived by his wife, Sarah Chapman Gilbert (his second wife and daughter of Joseph Gilbert, niece of Abijah Gilbert) who lived from 1832 to 1882 and his four children:
 Josephine Bates Hammond (1839–1886)
 Benjamin Edward Bates V (1863–1906)
 Sarah Frances Bates Herschel (1867–1937)
 Lillian Gilbert Bates (1872–1951)
 Arthur Hobart Herschel (1870–1953)
Bates College's inaugural president, Oren Burbank Cheney said the following of Bates delivering his eulogy: Bates wanted labor for our laborers, education for our children, places of worship for our worshipers, light for our streets, water for our houses, and a hospital for our sick and our dying. I have heard the man [Bates] speak of his love for Lewiston, and his love for the college. While in Lewiston, our desires were his desires: our interests were his interests: and our affairs his affairs...Alfred J. Lebel, a Lewiston native, attended Bates College, and went on to run the Bates Manufacturing Company from 1985 to 1999.

References

Citations

Extended notes
Oren Cheney, "Eulogy on the Life of Benjamin Edward Bates," Bates Student, June 1878, 131–149, (Muskie Archives and Special Collections Library, Bates College) (part 2).

External links

Benjamin Bates Eulogy, pg. 131-149, Bates Student 1877–78 (part 2)

1808 births
1878 deaths
Philanthropists from Maine
Bates College people
University and college founders
People from Mansfield, Massachusetts
People from Lewiston, Maine
People of Maine in the American Civil War
American Civil War industrialists
American Congregationalists
American chief executives
American bankers
American financiers
Burials at Mount Auburn Cemetery
American temperance activists
People from Bristol, Maine
19th-century American philanthropists